Marie-Lucie Tarpent (born November 9, 1941) is a French-born Canadian linguist, formerly an associate professor of linguistics and French at Mount Saint Vincent University [MSVU], Halifax, Nova Scotia, Canada. She is known for her descriptive work on the Nisga'a language, a member of the Tsimshianic language family, and for her proof of the affiliation of the Tsimshianic languages to the Penutian language group.

Early life and education
Marie-Lucie Tarpent was born on November 9, 1941, in Tonnerre, France. Tarpent graduated with a Licence ès Lettres (bachelor's) degree in English and German from University of Paris, Sorbonne in 1963. The following year, she attended the University of Vermont before earning a master's degree in linguistics in 1965 from Cornell University. From 1967–1970 and 1974–1977, Tarpent attended Simon Fraser University. She was on a Social Sciences and Humanities Research Council doctoral fellowship in from 1981–1983. In 1983, Tarpent was a part-time instructor at Northwest Community College (now called "Coast Mountain College"). She completed her Doctorate in Linguistics at the University of Victoria in 1989.

Career 
In addition to her work on the Nisga'a language, in the 1990s she contributed to the expansion of Harlan I. Smith's early work: Ethnobotany of the Gitksan Indians of British Columbia with details of the Gitksan language. The expanded version was published in 1997. While at the University of Victoria, she published an analysis of the counting systems of the Nishga and Gitskan languages.

In 1998, Tarpent, with linguist Daythal Kendall, presented a paper on the lack of evidence for a close relationship between the Oregon Penutian languages Takelma and Kalapuyan, and therefore for the previously hypothesized "Takelman". In 1999, Tarpent authored a chapter titled ""On the eve of a new paradigm: The current challenges to comparative linguisitics in a Kuhnian perspective." She has contributed significantly to the knowledge on Nisga'a and Southern Tsimshianic languages at Kitasoo/Xaixais First Nation, particularly in regard to the importance of morphemes.

Starting in September 2007, Tarpent was one of ten senior scholars in the field of linguistics to participate in the International Polar Year project "Documenting Alaskan and Neighboring Languages."

Works

References

External links 
CV from the University of Alaska

Living people
1941 births
Linguists from Canada
Women linguists
Canadian women academics
Paleolinguists
Linguists of Penutian languages
Linguists of Tsimshianic languages
Academic staff of Mount Saint Vincent University
College of Sorbonne alumni
University of Victoria alumni
Cornell University alumni
University of Vermont alumni
Simon Fraser University alumni
People from Tonnerre, Yonne
20th-century Canadian women scientists
21st-century Canadian women scientists
20th-century linguists
21st-century linguists
French emigrants to Canada